MBK Entertainment was a South Korean entertainment company established by Kim Kwang-soo.

The company was originally founded in 1999 as GM Planning. The company was absorbed by Mnet Media in 2006, following Kim Kwang-soo joint with CJ Group as their director. In 2007, the company re-launch as Core Contents Media under Mnet Media. In September 2009, Kim Kwang-soo was removed from the list as director of Mnet Media and then effectively his own company ended business with Mnet Media.

On October 1, 2014, Core Contents Media had been acquired by MBK Co., Ltd. (formerly CS ELSOLAR Co., Ltd.) and renamed as MBK Entertainment (abbreviation for "Music Beyond Korea").

In December 2016, MBK Entertainment parent company MBK would suspended their entertainment business.

In May 2018, Kim Kwang-soo and its subsidiary label The Unit: Idol Rebooting Project Culture Industry Company (then-known as PocketDol Studio) were revealed that secretly partnership with PD Han Kyeong-cheon to produced survival program The Unit: Idol Rebooting Project. He also confirmed that he would be focused as producer for winning group UNB and UNI.T.

In October 2018, MBK and MBC launched a talent show titled Under Nineteen, a contest for male trainees under the age of 19 years old to compete for a spot to be in a new K-pop idol group 1the9. The final winners would sign a 12-month contract under MBK (then PocketDol Studio) after a 5-month contract with MBC.

In April 2020, MBK representation contestant in Produce X 101, Hangyul and Dohyon debuted as duo H&D under PocketDol Studio. In May 2020, DIA were transferred to sub-label PocketDol Studio ahead of their June comeback.

As 2022, the company closed after moving the company to its subsidiary PocketDol Studio.

Former artists 
 SG Wannabe (2006–2009)
 SeeYa  (2009–2011)
 Kim Yeon-ji (2009–2011)
 Lee Bo-ram (2009–2016)
 Black Pearl (2007–2012)
 Yangpa (2007–2012)
 Supernova  (2007–2012)
 Coed School   (2010–2013)
 Kangho  (2010–2011)
 Davichi (2008–2014)
 Hong Jin-young (2009–2014)
 Gangkiz  (2012–2014)
 Hwang Ji-hyun (2012–2013)
 Kwak So-min (2012–2013)
 Jo Eun-byul (2012–2013)
 F-ve Dolls  (2011–2015)
 Lee Soo-mi  (2009–2012)
 Huh Chan-mi  (2010–2012)
 Seo Eun-kyo (2011–2015)
 Oh Yeon-kyung (2013–2015)
 Han Na-yeon (2013–2015)
 Jin Hye-won (2010–2015)
 Ryu Hyo-young (2010–2016)
 Koh Na-young (2015)
 Kwang Toh (2014–2015)
 SPEED   (2012–2015)
 Kwangheng  (2010–2012)
 Noori  (2010–2012)
 Taewoon  (2010–2015)
 Taeha (2012–2016)
 Jongkook (2012–2016)
 Sungmin (2010–2016)
 Jungwoo (2010–2016)
 The SeeYa  (2012–2015)
 HighBrow (2015–2016)
 T-ara (2009–2017)
 Hwayoung  (2010–2012)
 Areum  (2012–2014)
 Boram (2009–2017)
 Soyeon (2009–2017)
 Qri (2009–2017)
 Eunjung (2009–2017)
 Hyomin (2009–2017)
 Jiyeon (2009–2017)
 Nutaz (2014–2017)
 Shannon (2011–2019)
 Kim Dani (2012–2019)
 DIA (2015–2022)
 Cho Seung-hee  (2013–2016)
 Eunjin  (2015–2018)
 Jenny (2015–2019) 
 Somyi (2017–2022)
 Lee Ju-eun (2017–2022)
 Yebin (2015–2022)
 Ki Hui-hyeon (2015–2022)
 Eunice (2015–2022)
 Eunchae (2016–2022)
 Jung Chae-yeon (2015–2022)

Former actors
 No Min-woo (2009–2012)
 Nam Gyu-ri  (2006–2014)
 Ha Seok-jin (20??–2015)
 Choi Soo-eun  (2012–2015)
 Kim Gyu-ri (2014–2016)
 Son Ho-jun (20??–2016)
 Baek Da-eun (2016)
 Kim Ga-hwa  (2012–2017)
 Kim Min-chae (2014–2017)
 Yoon So-ra (2014–2017)
 Kim Min-hyung (2014–2017)
 Jun Jae-hyun  (2012–2017)
 Moon Hee-kyung (2015–2017)
 Park Se-jun (2016–2018)
 Park Sang-won (20??–2019)
 Kim Yu-hwan (2012–2019)

Note

Discography

Filmography
 Death Bell (2008)
 Cinderella Man (2009)
 Death Bell 2: Bloody Camp (2010)
 Sweet Temptation (2015)
 The Unit: Idol Rebooting Project (2017–2018)
 Under Nineteen (2018–2019)
 Miss Trot (2019)
 Produce X101 (2019)
 Mr Trot (2020)
 My Teenage Girl (2021-2022)

Notes

References

External links
 

 
Record labels established in 2006
Music publishing companies of South Korea
Television production companies of South Korea
South Korean record labels
K-pop record labels
Labels distributed by Kakao M
Defunct record labels of South Korea